Erpetosaurus is an extinct genus of dvinosaurian temnospondyl within the family Eobrachyopidae. Erpetosaurus is only known from the Upper Freeport Coal, Allegheny Group, Middle Pennsylvanian of Linton, Ohio, USA. Some unique features of the temnospondlys are that they have a single fang on each premaxilla on the anterior maxilla for the reception of two dentary fangs; and an elongate, tube-like backside extension of the parasphenoid, both hinting to an aquatic hunting lifestyle.

References

Sources 

 https://www.palass.org/publications/special-papers-palaeontology/archive/86/article_pp57-73
 https://kb.osu.edu/dspace/bitstream/handle/1811/23240/V088N1_055.pdf

See also
 Prehistoric amphibian
 List of prehistoric amphibians

Dvinosaurs